Daybeds are used as beds as well as for lounging, reclining, and seating in common rooms. It may be considered a form of multifunctional furniture. Their frames can be made out of wood, metal or a combination of wood and metal. They are a cross between a chaise longue, a couch, and a bed.

Daybeds typically feature a back and sides and may for example come in twin size (100 cm × 190 cm; 39 in × 75 in).  Often daybeds will also feature a trundle to expand sleeping capacity.

Modern daybeds 

Many of today's daybeds employ a linkspring as the support system for the mattress. The linkspring is a rectangular metal frame (roughly the footprint of the mattress) with cross supports. A wire or polyester/nylon mesh held in place by a network of springs lies across the top of the linkspring. The linkspring design provides support and creates clearance underneath a daybed for storage.

There are two categories of modern daybeds, indoor and outdoor. Daybeds can be hanging or stable; outdoor day beds usually have a roof-like structure to protect them from sunlight whereas indoor daybeds are simple. 

Infant beds can be converted into a daybed by removing one side.

See also
 Bed size
 Fainting room
 Futon
 Knole sofa

References

External links 

Beds
Couches
Furniture